Hudson River Trading (HRT) is a quantitative trading firm headquartered in New York City and founded in 2002. In 2014, it accounted for about 5% of all trading in the United States. HRT employs over 800 people in offices around the world, including New York, Chicago, Austin, Boulder, London, Singapore, Shanghai, and Mumbai. They research and develop automated trading algorithms using advanced mathematical techniques.

Trading

HRT is a multi-asset class firm that trades across various time horizons. It differs from stereotypical high-frequency trading (HFT) firms in several important ways: it holds about 25% of its trading capital overnight (unlike most HFT firms that hold almost nothing overnight), its average holding time is about five minutes as opposed to the sub-second times observed for some HFT firms, and it does less than 1% of its trading in dark pools, the lightly regulated private trading venues under scrutiny from regulators.

People

The firm hires programmers, software engineers, and mathematicians to develop and improve its trading strategies. HRT head of business development Adam Nunes has been cited in a Wall Street Journal article on financial firms' efforts to recruit programming talent away from Silicon Valley and his reasons for optimism about their ability to do so.

Scrutiny

In January 2014, HRT and three other quantitative trading firms formed the Modern Markets Initiative, a trade lobbying group. In August 2014, Bart Chilton was added as an advisor to the group.

In March 2014, New York Attorney General Eric Schneiderman announced a probe into high-frequency traders, including HRT, getting early access to raw stock market feeds at an annual price of $180,000. HRT head of business development Adam Nunes defended the company's business practices in statements made to Newsweek, noting that Wall Street traders also had access to the feeds at the same price and many of them already made use of them.

In July 2014, the Securities and Exchange Commission (SEC) in the United States launched a probe into ten top high-frequency trading firms, including HRT.

Media coverage

Hudson River Trading has been covered in the Wall Street Journal, Financial Times, and Newsweek.

See also

 Jane Street Capital
 Two Sigma Investments
 PDT Partners

References

External links

 

Trading companies
Financial services companies established in 2002
Companies based in New York City